Kilpatrick is an Irish surname, possibly a branch of the Cenél nEógain of the Northern Uí Néill. It may refer to:

People
Bill Kilpatrick, rugby league footballer of the 1920s and 1930s for Other Nationalities, and Oldham
Carl Kilpatrick, professional basketball player
Carolyn Cheeks Kilpatrick (born 1945), American politician from Detroit, Michigan
Charles Kilpatrick (athlete) (1874–1921), American athlete
Charles Kilpatrick (politician), trade union president and member of the Queensland Legislative Council
Hugh J. Kilpatrick (1836–1881), American Union Army general; U.S. Minister to Chile
James J. Kilpatrick (1920–2010), American columnist and television commentator
John Kilpatrick (1889–1960), American athlete, soldier, and sports businessperson
Judith Kilpatrick (1952–2002), English headteacher 
Julie Kilpatrick (born 1983), Scottish field hockey player
Kim Kilpatrick, Canadian Paralympic swimmer
Kwame Kilpatrick (born 1970), American politician, former mayor of Detroit, Michigan
Nancy Kilpatrick, Canadian author 
Patrick Kilpatrick (born 1949), American actor
Robin Kilpatrick, Scottish footballer
Sean Kilpatrick (born 1990), American basketball player
William Heard Kilpatrick (1871–1965), American educator
 Sir William John Kilpatrick, Australian air force officer, charity and community worker, responsible for setting up the Winston Churchill Memorial Trust in Australia

Places
Kilpatrick, Ardnurcher, a townland in Ardnurcher civil parish, barony of Moycashel, County Westmeath, Republic of Ireland
Kilpatrick, County Antrim, Northern Ireland, a townland of County Antrim
Kilpatrick, County Cork, a civil parish in County Cork, Republic of Ireland
Kilpatrick, County Kildare, a civil parish in County Kildare, Republic of Ireland
Kilpatrick, County Westmeath (civil parish), a civil parish in the barony of Fore, Republic of Ireland
Kilpatrick, Fore, a townland in Kilpatrick civil parish, barony of Fore, County Westmeath, Republic of Ireland
Kilpatrick, Leny, a townland in Leny civil parish, barony of Corkaree, County Westmeath, Republic of Ireland
Kilpatrick, Mullingar, a townland in Mullingar civil parish, barony of Moyashel and Magheradernon, County Westmeath, Republic of Ireland
Kilpatrick, Rathconrath, a townland in Rathconrath civil parish, barony of Rathconrath, County Westmeath, Republic of Ireland 
Kilpatrick, Tipperary, a civil parish in County Tipperary, Republic of Ireland
 Kilpatrick Hills, central Scotland
New Kilpatrick, East Dunbartonshire, Scotland
Old Kilpatrick, West Dunbartonshire, Scotland

Other uses
Clan Kirkpatrick, a Lowland Scottish clan
John Kilpatrick Turnpike, Oklahoma, United States
Macgregor Kilpatrick Trophy, American Hockey League trophy
Kilpatrick limit, the maximum electric field achievable in particle accelerators
Kilpatrick Townsend & Stockton, law firm
Oysters Kilpatrick (also called Oysters Kirkpatrick), English recipe involving oysters, cheese, and bacon

See also
Kirkpatrick (disambiguation)